Aleksandr Gukov (born 18 March 1972 in Minsk) is a retired breaststroke swimmer from Belarus, who won two gold medal in the men's breaststroke events at the 1997 European Championships in Seville, Spain. He represented his native country at two consecutive Summer Olympics, starting in Atlanta, Georgia (1996).

References
 

1972 births
Living people
Belarusian male swimmers
Male breaststroke swimmers
Olympic swimmers of Belarus
Swimmers at the 1996 Summer Olympics
Swimmers at the 2000 Summer Olympics
Medalists at the FINA World Swimming Championships (25 m)
European Aquatics Championships medalists in swimming